The Salmon Act 1986 is a United Kingdom Act of Parliament which outlines legislation that covers legal and illegal matter within the salmon farming and fishing industries. Among the provisions in the Act, it makes it illegal to "handle salmon in suspicious circumstances", which is defined in law as when one believes, or could reasonably believe, that salmon has been illegally fished or that salmon—that has come from an illegal source—has been received, retained, removed, or disposed of.

Provisions
The act contains 69 paragraphs, dealing with a wide range of detailed matters relating to salmon fisheries. Matters covered include
 the definition and registration of "salmon fishery", the legal regulation of close seasons on such fisheries, and the constitution and governance of salmon fishery boards.
 regulation of the methods allowed for salmon fishing (specifically, giving the Secretary of State the power to define what is meant by various forms of net fishing)
 regulation of the trade-in salmon dealers.
A large part of the Act updates Victorian-era legislation, for instance, the Salmon Fisheries (Scotland) Act 1868.

Handling salmon in suspicious circumstances
Section 32 of the Act is headed "Handling Salmon in Suspicious Circumstances". This section creates an offence in England and Wales or Scotland for any person who receives or disposes of any salmon in circumstances where they believe, or could reasonably believe, that the salmon has been illegally fished. Essentially, this is a provision aimed at reducing salmon poaching by making the handling of poached salmon a criminal offence. Section 22 introduces a parallel provision into Scottish law.

This offence is often cited, without its context, in lists of quirky or absurd laws—often alongside archaic or downright mythical "laws".

References

Fisheries law